Šenturška Gora ( or) is a small settlement in the Municipality of Cerklje na Gorenjskem in the Upper Carniola region of Slovenia.

The local church is dedicated to Saint Ulrich, thus the name of the village (literally, 'Mount Saint Ulrich').  It was built in 1368 and extended in the late 17th century.

References

External links

Šenturška Gora on Geopedia

Populated places in the Municipality of Cerklje na Gorenjskem